Denmark is a European Parliament constituency for elections in the European Union covering the member state of Denmark, but not other parts of the Danish Realm such as the Faroe Islands or Greenland, which are not part of the EU. It is currently represented by fourteen Members of the European Parliament. Denmark uses the D'Hondt method of proportional representation. Electoral coalitions between two or more parties are allowed.

Current Members of the European Parliament

Elections

1979

The 1979 European election was the first direct election to the European Parliament to be held and hence the first time Denmark had voted.

1984

The 1989 European election was the second election to the European Parliament and the second for Denmark.

1989

The 1989 European election was the third election to the European Parliament and the third for Denmark. The election was held on 15 June 1989. The electoral coalitions were Social Democrats and Danish Social Liberal Party, The Conservative People's Party and Venstre, Socialist People's Party and People's Movement against the EU, (Centre Democrats and Christian Democrats), and (Progress Party) by themselves.

1994

The 1994 European election was the fourth election to the European Parliament and the fourth for Denmark. The election was held on 9 June 1994 for Denmark. The electoral coalitions were Danish Social Liberal Party and Christian Democrats, The Conservative People's Party, Centre Democrats, and Venstre, June Movement and People's Movement against the EU, and the remaining parties by themselves.

1999

The 1999 European election was the fifth election to the European Parliament and the fifth for Denmark. The electoral coalitions were The Conservative People's Party, Centre Democrats and Venstre, June Movement and People's Movement against the EU, and the remaining parties by themselves.

2004

The 2004 European election was the sixth election to the European Parliament and the sixth for Denmark. The election was held on 13 June 2004. The opposition Social Democrats made major gains, mainly at the expense of Eurosceptic parties such as the June Movement. The electoral coalitions were Social Democrats and Socialist People's Party, Danish Social Liberal Party and Christian Democrats, The Conservative People's Party and Venstre, June Movement and People's Movement against the EU, and Danish People's Party by themselves. Compared to straight allocation by party, The People's Movement Against the EU gained one seat at the expense of the Conservative People's Party.

2009

The 2009 European election was the seventh election to the European Parliament and the seventh for Denmark.

2014

The 2014 European election was the eighth election to the European Parliament and the eighth for Denmark.

2019

The 2019 European election was the ninth election to the European Parliament and the ninth for Denmark.

See also
 Greenland (European Parliament constituency)

References

External links
 European Election News by European Election Law Association (Eurela)
 List of MEPs europarl.europa.eu

European Parliament constituencies in Denmark
1979 establishments in Denmark
Constituencies established in 1979